Luv Bug are a Northern Irish pop band originating from Newry. They are most famous for representing Ireland in the Eurovision Song Contest in 1986 with the song "You Can Count on Me".

Career 
The earliest incarnation of the group were formed as an amateur teenage band in early 1977. Playing local gigs they were then taken on by manager Michael Magill and went professional in late 1982 and consisted of sister and brothers June (lead vocals), Hugh (bass) and Max (guitar) Cunningham along with Ricky Meyler (vocals and keyboards) and Majella Grant (drums).

They became successful as a live act throughout Ireland and released their first single "Red Light Spells Danger" in 1984. The song was a cover of the Billy Ocean track and was followed up by a string of their own compositions, many of which became hits on the Irish Charts. Among their best known hits are "Living in Stereo" (1985), "On My Own" (1986) and "Look at Me I'm Dancing" (1985).

In 1986, they won the National Song Contest with their song "You Can Count on Me" and competed in that year's Eurovision Song Contest in Norway. They ended the night fourth out of twenty entrants and the song reached the Irish top five.

The group continued successfully, releasing their first album a year later. In 1988 they signed a recording deal with Virgin Records in the UK with two single releases under a different name, Heart of Ice. By the end of the decade the group had toured Europe and had completed some recording work in Los Angeles.

In 1992 the group entered the National Song Contest (now titled Eurosong) again with the song "Close to Your Heart", but lost out to Linda Martin who went on to win the Eurovision song contest that year in Malmo.

Luv Bug still continue today as a four-piece, performing live mainly in Ireland. They are handled by Michael Magill Entertainments and perform for private functions. Their set list is made up of cover versions, with none of their own songs included.

Discography 
Singles:

Album:
April 1987 – Luv Bug

See also 
Ireland in the Eurovision Song Contest
1986 Eurovision Song Contest

References 

Pop music groups from Northern Ireland
Eurovision Song Contest entrants for Ireland
Eurovision Song Contest entrants of 1986